Animal Crackers is an animated television series produced by the CINAR Corporation and Alphanim. It is based on the comic strip Animal Crackers by the US cartoonist Roger Bollen. The show was first introduced in September 7, 1997 and ended with the final episode in September 16, 2000. It lasted for three seasons with all episodes.

Plot
The show that tells about a group of anthropomorphic animals that live in a fictional jungle in Africa called Freeborn.

Telecast and home media
The show was first aired in Canada on Teletoon during its launch in 1997, but added in the U.S. on Fox Family (now Freeform) in 1998 until 2000 and the Cookie Jar Toons block on This TV from November 2008 until August 2009. In foreign countries, the show was also aired in France on La Cinquième (now France 5). As of 2022, the show is now streaming on Tubi.

Characters

Major characters
 Lyle Lion (voiced by Mark Camacho): Passive, insecure and a mama's boy, Lyle is not what one might call "King of the Jungle". (He's more of a prince, who is incapable of being king), intent on taking philosophy classes and ordering a pizza (preferably vegetarian) than to be the dominant predator. Despite multiple failed attempts, his number one goal in life is to date Lana. Outside his love life, his other goal is to be an astronomer. 
 Dodo (voiced by Teddy Lee Dillon): He is the last remaining dodo alive and is Lyle's best friend. Rash, impatient and slightly self-centered, he is extremely hot-headed and refuses to believe that he lacks the ability to fly. This leads to multiple failed attempts to take flight, sometimes using some very innovative and unusual techniques, all of which fail.
 Eugene the Elephant (voiced by Terrence Scammell): Despite his size and nature, this pachyderm is really an "overgrown baby" who craves attention. He is rather arrogant and obnoxious and is not afraid to bully others with his size and strength to get what he wants. Some of his secret pleasures include inhaling loads of peanut butter and stomping petunias but the sight of a tiny mouse will freak him out.
 Gnu the Wildebeest (voiced by Marc Montgomery): For a "supposed" leader of a herd, Gnu lacks any leadership qualities; rather, his traits show the exact opposite of a leader: lazy, timid and no sense of direction. Despite his nature, Gnu does mean well and is very dedicated to his herd, even though his presence there will hinder rather than help. A single father with a son he loves very much, he is a caring parent.
 Lana the Lioness (voiced by Kate Hutchinson): Lana is smart, attractive, strong-minded and the object of Lyle's affection. Lana is quite caring towards her fellow inhabitants of Freeborn and will put the group ahead of herself. She is an avid book lover and is often found with her nose in a novel. Despite showing little to no interest in Lyle's pursuits, it has been hinted that perhaps she does have a crush on him.

Supporting characters
 Tito: a silent chameleon with no dialogue in the entire series. Often Tito can be found among the main characters, but due to his size and silent nature, he's usually either knocked aside, stepped or sat on, or used for some purpose, the characters mistaking him for an inanimate object. Despite this, Tito rarely holds any ill-will or contempt for the others and often shows to be very intelligent or at least at times on the same level as Lana, able to solve a problem or fix something when most of the other characters can't figure it out
 Lance: Another lion who competes with Lyle for Lana's attention
 Louie: Lyle's nephew. Being a cub still in diapers, Louie speaks in a manner similar to Mikey from Look Who's Talking where the audience can hear his thoughts, but the characters within the show are unaware what he's thinking. Unlike most animals on the Preserve, Louie doesn't think less of Lyle for his shortcomings, though he does show more self-awareness and intelligence than his uncle
 Bud and Edna: Two recurring human tourists, both the common stereotype of the annoying tourist couple who bumble about, usually completely unaware of what's really going on around them and making things more uncomfortable for the locals
 Junior and herd: Junior is Gnu's son (though never properly named in the series beyond 'Junior', so it is possible he shares his father's name) he is shown to be smarter and have more common sense than his father and is sometimes embarrassed by him, but understands Gnu's desire to be a leader and a good father and loves and respects him for this. The herd meanwhile don't show as much respect but are rather fittingly about as lazy as Gnu, often bailing on him whenever he calls for a stampede. Ironically, it is their lazy tendencies that keep Gnu as leader as any other leader (such as Roland the Waterbuffalo) would forcibly work them hard and into shape, which they don't want. Some of the herd have more distinct personalities, such as the gnu with a backwards baseball cap who speaks like a Californian surfer stereotype, an especially geeky gnu with an ID tag on his ear (these two can often be seen together), and a smaller gnu about Junior's age who appears to be the geeky gnu's little brother as they share similar characteristics, such as glasses and buck teeth
 Elmo the Crocodile: A somewhat passive and laid back crocodile who usually just floats in the pond. He tends to be the butt of physical pain humor every now and then as someone ends up landing on his head when jumping into the pond. Although he's as docile as any of the other animals in the Preserve, he will on the rare occasion indulge his predatory instincts  by trying and failing to convince smaller animals to allow him to eat them
 Roland the African buffalo
 Lamont the Hippopotamus
 Roxanne the Ostrich (voiced by Dawn Ford)
 Grandpa Tortoise and his grandsons
 Sergeant Rhino
 Snake
 Frog and Toad

Episode list

Season one

Season two

Season three

Crew
 Micheline Charest – executive producer
 Ronald A. Weinberg – executive producer
 Christian Davin – co-executive producer
 Cassandra Schafhausen – producer
 Nadja Cozic – director
 Louis Piche – director
 Pascal Pinon – director
 Katell Lardeux – line producer
 Justine Hyun Van Phong – line producer
 Lesley Taylor – line producer
 Natalie Dumoulin – associate producer
 Jan Van Rijsselberge – animation supervisor
 Heidi Blomkvist – timing director
 Sebastian Grunsta – timing director
 Alan Jeffery – timing director
 Jean Pilotte – timing director
 Pascal Pinon – co-director
 Greg Bailey – supervising director
 Andrew Gryn – talent coordinator
 Eric Theriault – background design
 Wayne Millett – background design supervisor

Writing credits
 Roger Bollen – comic strip
 Joseph Mallozzi – writer
 Ian Boothby – writer
 Wayne Millett – writer
 Jennifer Kierans – writer
 Pierre Colin-Tiebert – writer
 Thomas LaPierre – writer
 Jacques Bouchard – writer
 Jacques Daviault – writer
 Patrick Granleese – writer
 Hugh Neilson – writer
 Maureen Neilson – writer
 Michael Palmeter – writer
 Gerard Lewis – writer
 John Handforth – writer
 Ken Ross – writer
 Amy Jo Cooper – writer
 Greg Van Riel – writer
 Kim Segal – writer
 Rick Jones – writer
 Natalie Dumoulin – writer
 Heidi Foss – writer
 Lynn Mason – writer
 Brian Cameron Fuld – writer
 Rowby Goren – writer
 David Acer – writer
 Michael Leo Donovan – writer
 Bryan Michael Stoller – writer
 Anne-Marie Perrotta – writer
 Daniel Baldassi – writer
 Michael F. Hamill – writer
 Barry Julian – writer
 Tean Schultz – writer
 Thor Bishopric – writer
 Todd Swift – writer
 Vigeland Rubin – writer

References

External links
  at DHX Media
 

1997 Canadian television series debuts
Canadian children's animated comedy television series
1997 French television series debuts
1999 French television series endings
Fox Family Channel original programming
France Télévisions children's television series
France Télévisions television comedy
1990s French animated television series
French children's animated comedy television series
Gaumont Animation
Television series by Cookie Jar Entertainment
Television shows filmed in Montreal
Teletoon original programming
1990s Canadian animated television series
2000s Canadian animated television series
2000 Canadian television series endings
Television shows based on comic strips
Animated television series about elephants
Animated television series about birds
Animated television series about lions
Television shows set in Africa
Dodo
English-language television shows